Rafael Chirbes (27 June 1949 – 15 August 2015) was a Spanish novelist. He was born in Tavernes de la Valldigna in Valencia. He is the author of several novels, two of which have won the Premio de la Crítica de narrativa castellana - Crematorio (2007) and En la orilla (2013). The latter also won the Premio Nacional de Narrativa.

Chirbes is further known for his trilogy of novels dealing with postwar Spain (La larga marcha, La caída de Madrid and Los viejos amigos). He also wrote several collections of essays.

His 2007 work Crematorio was made into an acclaimed television series in 2014.

Works

Novels
 Mimoun (1988)
 En la lucha final (1991)
 La buena letra (1992)
 Los disparos del cazador (1994)
 La larga marcha (1996)
 La caída de Madrid (2000)
 Los viejos amigos (2003)
 Crematorio (2007). Cremation, trans. Valerie Miles (New Directions, 2021).
 En la orilla (2013). On the Edge, trans. Margaret Jull Costa (New Directions, 2016).
 París-Austerlitz (2016)

Essays
 Mediterráneos (1997)
 El novelista perplejo (2002)
 El viajero sedentario (2004)
 Por cuenta propia (2010)

References

External links

1949 births
2015 deaths
21st-century Spanish novelists
20th-century Spanish novelists
Spanish gay writers
Spanish LGBT novelists
LGBT history in Spain